David Júnior Lopes (born 19 July 1982, in Maringá) is a Brazilian former football defender.

Career
David Júnior Lopes began his career in the youth ranks of Adap Galo Maringá Football Club and Clube Atlético Paranaense. He made his professional debut with Atlético Paranaense during the 2002/03 season. At mid season he signed with Portugal's F.C. Porto and was assigned to the B team.
 
After two years in Portugal, he returned to Brazil signing with Iraty SC. During the winter transfer period he returned to Europe signing with Croatian club NK Osijek. He was a regular for Osijek appearing in 35 league matches in his eighteen months at the club.

In 2008, he joined Russian league club FC Terek Grozny, participating in 14 matches with the club. During the winter transfer period he was again on the move, this time joining Spanish Second Division side Córdoba CF.
He made his debut against Villarreal CF B scoring a goal in the match. At the end of the season he left the club and signed with Universitatea Craiova in Romania.

After one season in Romania the Brazilian defender signed with Chivas USA of Major League Soccer during the latter part of the 2011 season. He was traded to LA Galaxy on 10 April 2012 in exchange for Paolo Cardozo.

Lopes was released by Los Angeles at the end of the 2013 MLS season.

Honours
Los Angeles Galaxy
MLS Cup: 2012

References

External links
 Profile at Sportbox.ru 
 
 
 
 
 

1982 births
Living people
Brazilian footballers
Brazilian expatriate footballers
Brazilian expatriate sportspeople in the United States
Brazilian expatriate sportspeople in Romania
Iraty Sport Club players
NK Osijek players
FC Akhmat Grozny players
FC U Craiova 1948 players
FC Porto players
Chivas USA players
LA Galaxy players
Córdoba CF players
Russian Premier League players
Major League Soccer players
Croatian Football League players
Primeira Liga players
Liga I players
Expatriate footballers in Portugal
Expatriate footballers in Spain
Expatriate footballers in Croatia
Expatriate footballers in Russia
Expatriate footballers in Romania
Expatriate soccer players in the United States
People from Maringá
Segunda División players
Association football defenders
União Esporte Clube players
Sportspeople from Paraná (state)